Melba Newell Phillips (February 1, 1907 – November 8, 2004) was an American physicist and pioneer science educator. One of the first doctoral students of J. Robert Oppenheimer at the University of California, Berkeley, Phillips completed her Ph.D. in 1933, a time when few women pursued careers in science. In 1935 Oppenheimer and Phillips published their description of the Oppenheimer–Phillips process, an early contribution to nuclear physics that explained the behavior of accelerated nuclei of radioactive hydrogen atoms. Phillips was also known for refusing to cooperate with a U.S. Senate judiciary subcommittee's investigation on internal security during the McCarthy era that led to her dismissal from her professorship at Brooklyn College, where she was a professor of science from 1938 until 1952. (The college publicly and personally apologized to Phillips for the dismissal in 1987.)

Phillips also taught at the University of Minnesota (1941–44) and served as associate director of a teacher-training institute at Washington University in St. Louis (1957–62), before joining the faculty at the University of Chicago (1962–72) as a professor of physics. During her retirement years, Phillips was a visiting professor at Stony Brook University (1972–75) and taught at the University of Science and Technology of China, Chinese Academy of Science (1980), in Beijing. Phillips was a fellow of the American Physical Society and the American Association for the Advancement of Science. In addition to teaching, Phillips co-authored science textbooks and was active in the American Association of Physics Teachers. The AAPT established the Melba Newell Phillips Medal in her honor in 1981 to recognize outstanding service to the organization.

Early life and education
Melba Phillips was born on February 1, 1907, near Hazleton, Gibson County, Indiana. She was the only daughter and oldest of Eilda Elizabeth (Meehan) and Virgil B. Phillips' four children.

Phillips graduated from Union High school in 1922, at the age of fifteen. 
Intending to become an educator, Phillips studied mathematics at Oakland City College in Indiana, where she earned a bachelor of arts degree in 1926. Afterwards, Phillips taught at her former high school for two years before entering graduate school.

Phillips earned a master's degree in physics from Battle Creek College in Michigan in 1928 and a doctorate degree in physics at the University of California, Berkeley, in 1933. She was one of the first doctoral students of J. Robert Oppenheimer, who later became scientific head of the Manhattan Project, the Allied effort to develop the atomic bomb. In 1935 Oppenheimer and Phillips published their description of the Oppenheimer–Phillips process, which explained the behavior of accelerated nuclei of radioactive, "heavy hydrogen" atoms. The Oppenheimer–Phillips effect was one of the early contributions to nuclear physics.

Career
In an era when few women were working as scientists, Phillips became a leading science educator and spent the majority of her career as a professor of physics.

Phillips began teaching during the Great Depression. Initially, she took part-time, temporary positions at Battle Creek College (1928–30) and at Connecticut College for Women (1937–38). Phillips also held postdoctoral fellowships at the University of California and at Bryn Mawr College. In early 1936 the American Association of University Women announced that Philips was the recipient of its Margaret E. Maltby award, one of six women to receive its research fellowships for the 1936–37 academic year. Phillips's research focused on application of quantum mechanics to the study of nuclear physics. Prior to accepting a full-time faculty position at Brooklyn College in 1938, Phillips worked as a fellow at the Institute for Advanced Study in Princeton, New Jersey.

With the exception of a three-year period during World War II, when she taught at the University of Minnesota (1941–44), Phillips spent a decade as a professor of physics at Brooklyn College (1938–52). She also conducted research on a part-time basis at the Columbia University Radiation Laboratory. In 1945, while teaching at Brooklyn College, Phillips helped organize the Federation of American Scientists at a meeting held in Washington, D.C.

In 1952 Phillips was summoned to appear before the McCarran Commission, a judiciary subcommittee investigating internal security during the McCarthy era. Although Phillips appeared before a subcommittee hearing in New York and agreed to answer questions relating to her work as a scientist and physics educator, she invoked her Fifth Amendment rights when asked about other topics, including questions about whether she was a member of the Communist party. As a result of her refusal to cooperate with the commission as a matter of principle, Phillips, a highly regarded physics educator, was dismissed from her professorship at Brooklyn College and her part-time position at the Columbia University Radiation Laboratory. She remained unemployed as a college professor for five years.

While unemployed, Phillips lived on her modest savings and co-authored two science textbooks: Principles of Physical Science (1957), with Francis Bonner, and Classical Electricity and Magnetism (1955), with Wolfgang K. H. Panofsky. Both of these publications became standard textbooks in collegiate-level science courses.

Phillips returned to teaching in 1957, when she became associate director of a teacher-training institute at Washington University. Phillips remained at St. Louis until 1962, when she joined the faculty at the University of Chicago as a professor of physics. Under her guidance the university began teaching physical science courses to non-science majors. She also made laboratory work part of its curriculum. Phillips retired as a professor emerita from the University of Chicago in 1972, but continued to teach elsewhere.

Philips was active in the American Association of Physics Teachers throughout her career. She became a member of the AAPT in 1943 and served as its first woman president (1966–67). She also co-edited the organization's official history. In addition, Phillips served on the Commission in College Physics (1960–68) and on the advisory board of the School of Mathematics Study Group (1964–67). For her service to the field of science education, Phillips was elected a fellow of the American Physical Society and the American Association for the Advancement of Science.

McCarran Commission 
During the early Cold War, the Red Scare in the United States lead to widespread accusations of disloyalty. As part of this activity, Senator McCarran headed the Senate Internal Security Subcommittee which called Dr. Phillips to testify. Dr. Phillips worked not only with Robert Oppenheimer on nuclear physics and the Oppenheimer–Phillips process, but also worked with the Teacher's Union. When questioned about whether she was involved with the communist party, Phillips chose to neither confirm or deny, but to simply state that her lineage goes back just as far as any other American.

Some may wonder why she did not deny any involvement, especially when there has no evidence of collusion that has come to light since these investigations or her death. It is important to note that the McCarran Commission was not seen as respectable committee by all. Phillips was believed to hold the disposition that the committee's actions resembled those of the Witch Hunt referenced so often in times of panic. A woman of her accomplishments would not want attention from this committee to cast over her many achievements in science. However as pointed out before, college campuses seem to be hot spots for communist ideas. In 1948, the state of Washington launched an investigation on the University of Washington and was very displeased with its findings. Many of the professors admitted to being former communists and were fired because of it. This was believed to set an important precedent as it raises the question, is this the case at other universities? This rising tension between educational institutions and these investigative committees likely played a large part in Phillips's unwillingness to definitively state her ties. A denial and proper accordance to McCarran's trial would grant it respect and reason. A denial could also represent a back turn to her students and other teachers investigating ideas for how life should be managed. An admittance has very clear, bad implications but it would also require further investigation as there is no evidence of such ties.

Later years 

After her retirement from the University of Chicago in 1972, Phillips continued teaching as a visiting professor at Stony Brook University (1972–75) and at the Graduate School of the University of Science and Technology of China, Chinese Academy of Science, in Beijing in 1980.

In 1987 Brooklyn College publicly and personally apologized to Phillips for her dismissal from the College in 1952.

Death and legacy
Phillips died of coronary artery disease on November 8, 2004, at the age of ninety-seven, in a nursing home in Petersburg, Indiana.

As a leading physics educator of her era, Phillips received numerous citations and awards for her contributions to science education. Phillips is especially noted for developing and implementing curriculum for teaching physics and co-authoring two textbooks in the 1950s for collegiate physics courses. She also wrote and edited works history of physics and the history of the American Association of Physics Teachers.

Honors and tributes
 Member, Phi Beta Kappa.
 Fellow, American Physical Society and the American Association for the Advancement of Science.
 In 1974 Phillips was awarded the Oersted Medal from the American Association of Physics Teachers; she was also the recipient of the AAPT's Distinguished Service Citation in 1963.
 Phillips became the first recipient of the Melba Newell Phillips Medal, an award that the AAPT established in 1981. The medal is periodically presented to AAPT members  "who have provided creative leadership and dedicated service that resulted in exceptional contributions to AAPT."
 In 1981 Phillips received the Karl Taylor Compton Award from the American Institute of Physics.
 In 1988 she was the recipient of Vanderbilt University's Guy and Rebecca Forman Award for Outstanding Teaching in Undergraduate Physics.
 In 1997 Brooklyn College established a scholarship her honor.
 In 2003 the American Physical Society awarded its Joseph Burton Forum Award to Phillips for her contributions to science education, her role in founding the Federation of American Scientists, and as service as a role model "of a principled scientist."

Selected published works
 Principles of Physical Science, co-authored with Francis Bonner (Addison-Wesley Publishing Company, 1957) 
 Classical Electricity and Magnetism, co-authored with Wolfgang Panofsky (1957)
 Principles of Electrodynamics and Relativity, co-authored with P. G. Bergmann (1962)
 On Teaching Physics: Reprints of American Journal of Physics Articles from the First Half Century of AAPT (American Association of Physics Teachers, 1979) 
 Physics History from AAPT Journals (American Association of Physics Teachers, 1985)
 History of Physics (Readings from Physics Today, No 2) (American Institute of Physics, 1985)
 History of Physics II: The Life and Times of Modern Physics (Readings from Physics Today, No 5). (American Institute of Physics, 1992)

Notes

References
 
 
  
 
 "Scope of Material" in

Further reading

External links
 "Oral History Interviews: Melba Phillips", 5 December 1977, transcript, American Institute of Physics, Niels Bohr Library and Archives

American nuclear physicists
Physics educators
1907 births
2004 deaths
American women physicists
Washington University in St. Louis faculty
Washington University physicists
Oakland City University alumni
People from Gibson County, Indiana
People from Petersburg, Indiana
20th-century American physicists
20th-century American women scientists
Women nuclear physicists
Andrews University alumni
Brooklyn College faculty
Deaths from coronary artery disease
Fellows of the American Physical Society
University of Minnesota faculty
University of Chicago faculty